Bradina eucentra is a moth in the family Crambidae. It was described by Edward Meyrick in 1937. It is found in the Democratic Republic of the Congo.

References

Moths described in 1937
Bradina
Insects of the Democratic Republic of the Congo